The 1969 Pecan Bowl was a college football bowl game played between Drake Bulldogs and Arkansas State Indians at Memorial Stadium in Arlington, Texas. It was one of four regional finals in the NCAA College Division, which became Division II (and III) in 1973. The other three regional finals in 1969 were the Boardwalk, Grantland Rice, and Camellia bowls.

ASU jumped out to a 22–0 lead at halftime and held on to win, 29–21.

The Pecan Bowl was played again in Arlington in 1970, then was succeeded by the Pioneer Bowl in Wichita Falls in 1971.

Arkansas State changed its nickname from Indians to Red Wolves in 2008.

Scoring summary

First Quarter
Arkansas State - Lockhart 75 yard pass from Crocker (Everett kick)

Second Quarter
Arkansas State - Peyton 8 yard pass from Crocker (Crocker run)
Arkansas State - Croker 5 run (Everett kick)

Third Quarter
 Drake - Sharpe 2 run (pass failed)
 Drake - Miller 51 yard pass from Grejbowski (Chase kick)

Fourth Quarter
Arkansas State - Harrell 3 run (Everett kick)
Drake- Rogers 1 yard pass from Grejbowski ( Herbert pass from Grejbowski)

Individual statistics

Rushing

ASU- Harrell 34-160, Carr 9-49

DU- Sharpe 19-60, Rodgers 3-16

Passing

ASU- Crocker 6-11-176

DU- Grejbowski 15-37-

Receiving

ASU- Lockhart 2-110, Harrell 1-42, Johnson 2-16

DU- Miller 9-192, Rodgers 5-63

References

1969 NCAA College Division football season
Drake Bulldogs football bowl games
Arkansas State Red Wolves football bowl games
December 1969 sports events in the United States
Pecan Bowl